David Foster Wallace (February 21, 1962 – September 12, 2008) was an American novelist, short story writer, essayist, and university professor of English and creative writing. Wallace is widely known for his 1996 novel Infinite Jest, which Time magazine cited as one of the 100 best English-language novels from 1923 to 2005. His posthumous novel, The Pale King (2011), was a finalist for the Pulitzer Prize for Fiction in 2012.  The Los Angeles Timess David Ulin called Wallace "one of the most influential and innovative writers of the last twenty years".

Wallace grew up in Illinois and attended Amherst College. He taught English at Emerson College, Illinois State University, and Pomona College. In 2008, he died by suicide at age 46 after struggling with depression for many years.

Early life and education
David Foster Wallace was born in Ithaca, New York, to Sally Jean Wallace ( Foster) and James Donald Wallace. The family moved to Champaign-Urbana, Illinois, where he was raised along with his younger sister, Amy Wallace-Havens. His father was a philosophy professor at University of Illinois Urbana-Champaign. His mother was an English professor at Parkland College, a community college in Champaign, which recognized her work with a "Professor of the Year" award in 1996. From fourth grade, Wallace lived with his family in Urbana, where he attended Yankee Ridge Elementary School, Brookens Junior High School and Urbana High School. 

As an adolescent, Wallace was a regionally ranked junior tennis player. He wrote about this period in the essay "Derivative Sport in Tornado Alley", originally published in Harper's Magazine as "Tennis, Trigonometry, Tornadoes". Although his parents were atheists, Wallace twice attempted to join the Catholic Church, but "flunk[ed] the period of inquiry". He later attended a Mennonite church.

Wallace attended Amherst College, his father's alma mater, where he majored in English and philosophy and graduated summa cum laude in 1985. Among other extracurricular activities, he participated in glee club; his sister recalls that he "had a lovely singing voice". In studying philosophy, Wallace pursued modal logic and mathematics, and presented a senior thesis in philosophy and modal logic that was awarded the Gail Kennedy Memorial Prize and posthumously published as Fate, Time, and Language: An Essay on Free Will (2011).

Wallace adapted his honors thesis in English as the manuscript of his first novel, The Broom of the System (1987), and committed to being a writer. He told David Lipsky: "Writing The Broom of the System, I felt like I was using 97 percent of me, whereas philosophy was using 50 percent." Wallace completed a Master of Fine Arts degree in creative writing at the University of Arizona in 1987. He moved to Massachusetts to attend graduate school in philosophy at Harvard University, but soon left the program.

Later life 
In the early 1990s, Wallace was in a relationship with writer Mary Karr. She later described Wallace as obsessive about her and said the relationship was volatile, with Wallace once throwing a coffee table at her and once forcing her out of a car, leaving her to walk home. Years later, she said that Wallace's biographer D. T. Max underreported Wallace's abuse. Of Max's account of their relationship, she tweeted, "That's about 2% of what happened." She said that Wallace kicked her, climbed up the side of her house at night, and followed her 5-year-old son home from school. Several scholars and writers noted that Max's biography did cover the abuse and did not ignore the allegations Karr later reiterated on Twitter.

In 2002, Wallace met the painter Karen L. Green, whom he married on December 27, 2004.

Wallace struggled with depression, alcoholism, drug addiction, and suicidal tendencies, and was repeatedly hospitalized for psychiatric care. In 1989, he spent four weeks at McLean Hospital — a psychiatric institute in Belmont, Massachusetts, affiliated with the Harvard Medical School — where he successfully completed a drug and alcohol detoxification program. He later said his time there changed his life.

Dogs were important to Wallace, and he spoke of opening a shelter for stray canines. According to his friend Jonathan Franzen, he "had a predilection for dogs who'd been abused, and [were] unlikely to find other owners who were going to be patient enough for them".

Work

Career
The Broom of the System (1987) garnered national attention and critical praise. In The New York Times, Caryn James called it a "manic, human, flawed extravaganza … emerging straight from the excessive tradition of Stanley Elkin's The Franchiser, Thomas Pynchon's V., [and] John Irving's World According to Garp".

In 1991, Wallace began teaching literature as an adjunct professor at Emerson College in Boston. The next year, at the suggestion of colleague and supporter Steven Moore, Wallace obtained a position in the English department at Illinois State University. He had begun work on his second novel, Infinite Jest, in 1991, and submitted a draft to his editor in December 1993. After the publication of excerpts throughout 1995, the book was published in 1996.

In 1997, Wallace received a MacArthur Fellowship. He also received the Aga Khan Prize for Fiction, awarded by editors of The Paris Review for one of the stories in Brief Interviews with Hideous Men, which had been published in the magazine.

In 2002, Wallace moved to Claremont, California, to become the first Roy E. Disney Professor of Creative Writing and Professor of English at Pomona College. He taught one or two undergraduate courses per semester and focused on writing.

Wallace delivered the commencement address to the 2005 graduating class at Kenyon College. The speech was published as a book, This Is Water, in 2009. In May 2013 parts of the speech were used in a popular online video, also titled "This Is Water".

Bonnie Nadell was Wallace's literary agent during his entire career. Michael Pietsch was his editor on Infinite Jest.

Wallace died in 2008. In March 2009, Little, Brown and Company announced that it would publish the manuscript of an unfinished novel, The Pale King, that Wallace had been working on before his death. Pietsch pieced the novel together from pages and notes Wallace left behind. Several excerpts were published in The New Yorker and other magazines. The Pale King was published on April 15, 2011, and received generally positive reviews. Michiko Kakutani of The New York Times wrote that The Pale King "showcases [Wallace's] embrace of discontinuity; his fascination with both the meta and the microscopic, postmodern pyrotechnics and old-fashioned storytelling; and his ongoing interest in contemporary America's obsession with self-gratification and entertainment." The book was nominated for the Pulitzer Prize.

Throughout his career, Wallace published short fiction in periodicals such as The New Yorker, GQ, Harper's Magazine, Playboy, The Paris Review, Mid-American Review, Conjunctions, Esquire, Open City, Puerto del Sol, and Timothy McSweeney's Quarterly Concern.

Themes and styles
Wallace wanted to progress beyond the irony and metafiction associated with postmodernism and explore a post-postmodern or metamodern style. In the essay "E Unibus Pluram: Television and U.S. Fiction" (written 1990, published 1993), he proposed that television has an ironic influence on fiction, and urged literary authors to eschew TV's shallow rebelliousness: 

Wallace used many forms of irony, but tended to focus on individual persons' continued longing for earnest, unself-conscious experience and communication in a media-saturated society.

Wallace's fiction combines narrative modes and authorial voices that incorporate jargon and invented vocabulary, such as self-generated abbreviations and acronyms, long, multi-clause sentences, and an extensive use of explanatory endnotes and footnotes, as in Infinite Jest and the story "Octet" (collected in Brief Interviews with Hideous Men), and most of his non-fiction after 1996. In a 1997 interview on Charlie Rose, Wallace said that the notes were to disrupt the linear narrative, to reflect his perception of reality without jumbling the narrative structure, and that he could have jumbled the sentences "but then no one would read it".

D. T. Max has described Wallace's work as an "unusual mixture of the cerebral and the hot-blooded", often featuring multiple protagonists and spanning different locations in a single work. His writing comments on the fragmentation of thought, the relationship between happiness and boredom, and the psychological tension between the beauty and hideousness of the human body. According to Wallace, "fiction's about what it is to be a fucking human being", and he said he wanted to write "morally passionate, passionately moral fiction" that could help the reader "become less alone inside". In his Kenyon College commencement address, Wallace described the human condition as daily crises and chronic disillusionment and warned against succumbing to solipsism, invoking the existential values of compassion and mindfulness:

Nonfiction
Wallace covered Senator John McCain's 2000 presidential campaign and the September 11 attacks for Rolling Stone; cruise ships (in what became the title essay of his first nonfiction book), state fairs, and tornadoes for Harper's Magazine; the US Open tournament for Tennis magazine; the director David Lynch and the pornography industry for Première magazine; the tennis player Michael Joyce for Esquire; the movie-special-effects industry for Waterstone's magazine; conservative talk radio host John Ziegler for The Atlantic; and a Maine lobster festival for Gourmet magazine. He also reviewed books in several genres for the Los Angeles Times, The Washington Post, The New York Times, and The Philadelphia Inquirer. In the November 2007 issue of The Atlantic, which commemorated the magazine's 150th anniversary, Wallace was among the authors, artists, politicians and others who wrote short pieces on "the future of the American idea".

These and other essays appear in three collections, A Supposedly Fun Thing I'll Never Do Again, Consider the Lobster and the posthumous Both Flesh and Not, the last of which contains some of Wallace's earliest work, including his first published essay, "Fictional Futures and the Conspicuously Young".

Some writers have found parts of Wallace's nonfiction implausible. Franzen has said that he believes Wallace made up dialogue and incidents: "those things didn't actually happen". John Cook has remarked that "Wallace encounters pitch-perfect characters who speak comedically crystalline lines and place him in hilariously absurd situations...I used both stories [in teaching journalism] as examples of the inescapable temptation to shave, embellish, and invent narratives".

Death
Wallace's father said that David had suffered from major depressive disorder for more than 20 years and that antidepressant medication had allowed him to be productive. Wallace suffered what was believed to be a severe interaction of the medication with the food he had eaten one day at a restaurant, and in June 2007, on his doctor's advice, he stopped taking phenelzine, his primary antidepressant drug. His depression recurred, and he tried other treatments, including electroconvulsive therapy. Eventually he went back on phenelzine, but found it ineffective. On September 12, 2008, at age 46, Wallace wrote a private two-page suicide note to his wife, arranged part of the manuscript for The Pale King, and hanged himself on the back porch of his house in Claremont, California.

Memorial gatherings were held at Pomona College, Amherst College, the University of Arizona, Illinois State University, and on October 23, 2008, at New York University (NYU). The eulogists at NYU included his sister, Amy Wallace-Havens; his literary agent, Bonnie Nadell; Gerry Howard, editor of his first two books; Colin Harrison, an editor at Harper's Magazine; Michael Pietsch, editor of Infinite Jest and later works; Deborah Treisman, fiction editor at The New Yorker magazine; and the writers Don DeLillo, Zadie Smith, George Saunders, Mark Costello, Donald Antrim, and Jonathan Franzen.

Legacy 
In March 2010, it was announced that Wallace's personal papers and archives—drafts of books, stories, essays, poems, letters, and research, including the handwritten notes for Infinite Jest—had been purchased by the University of Texas at Austin. They are held at that university's Harry Ransom Center.

Since 2011 Loyola University New Orleans has offered English seminar courses on Wallace. Similar courses have also been taught at Harvard University. The first David Foster Wallace Conference was hosted by the Illinois State University Department of English in May 2014; the second was held in May 2015.

In January 2017 the International David Foster Wallace Society and the Journal of David Foster Wallace Studies were launched.

Among the writers who have cited Wallace as an influence are Dave Eggers, Jonathan Franzen, Rivka Galchen, Matthew Gallaway, David Gordon, John Green, Porochista Khakpour, George Saunders, Michael Schur,  Zadie Smith, Darin Strauss, Deb Olin Unferth, Elizabeth Wurtzel, and Charles Yu.

Adaptations

Film and television
A feature-length film adaptation of Brief Interviews with Hideous Men, directed by John Krasinski with an ensemble cast, was released in 2009 and premiered at the Sundance Film Festival.

The 19th episode of the 23rd season of The Simpsons, "A Totally Fun Thing That Bart Will Never Do Again" (2012), is loosely based on Wallace's essay "Shipping Out" from his 1997 collection, A Supposedly Fun Thing I'll Never Do Again. The Simpson family takes a cruise, and Wallace appears in the background of a scene, wearing a tuxedo T-shirt while eating in the ship's dining room. 

The 2015 film The End of the Tour is based on conversations David Lipsky had with Wallace, transcribed in Although of Course You End Up Becoming Yourself (2010). Jason Segel played Wallace, and Jesse Eisenberg Lipsky. The film won an Audience Award for Best Narrative Feature at the Sarasota Film Festival, and Segel was nominated for the Independent Spirit Award for Best Male Lead.

"Partridge", a Season 5 episode of NBC's Parks and Recreation, repeatedly references Infinite Jest, of which the show's co-creator, Michael Schur, is a noted fan. Schur also directed the music video for The Decemberists' "Calamity Song", which depicts the Eschaton game from Infinite Jest.

Stage and music adaptations
Twelve of the interviews from Brief Interviews with Hideous Men were adapted as a stage play in 2000 by Dylan McCullough. This was the first theatrical adaptation of Wallace's work. The play, Hideous Men, was also directed by McCullough, and premiered at the New York International Fringe Festival in August 2000.

Brief Interviews was also adapted by director Marc Caellas as a play, Brief Interviews with Hideous Writers, which premiered at Fundación Tomás Eloy Martinez in Buenos Aires on November 4, 2011. In 2012 it was adapted as a play by artist Andy Holden for a two-night run at the ICA in London.

The short story "Tri-Stan: I Sold Sissee Nar to Ecko", from Brief Interviews with Hideous Men, was adapted by composer Eric Moe into a 50-minute operatic piece, to be performed with accompanying video projections. The piece was described as having "subversively inscribed classical music into pop culture".

Infinite Jest was performed once as a stage play by Germany's experimental theater Hebbel am Ufer. The play was staged in various locations throughout Berlin, and the action took place over a 24-hour period.

"Good Old Neon", from Oblivion: Stories, was adapted and performed by Ian Forester at the 2011 Hollywood Fringe Festival, produced by the Los Angeles independent theater company Needtheater.

The song "Surrounded by Heads and Bodies", from the album A Brief Inquiry into Online Relationships by The 1975, borrows its title from the opening line of Infinite Jest. Matty Healy, The 1975's lead singer, said in an interview with Pitchfork that he was inspired by the novel after reading it during a stint in rehabilitation:

Bibliography

Novels 
 The Broom of the System (1987). 
 Infinite Jest (1996).  
 The Pale King (2011, posthumous). 
 Something to Do with Paying Attention (2022, posthumous, novella)

Short story collections
 Girl with Curious Hair (1989).  
 Brief Interviews with Hideous Men (1999).  
 Oblivion: Stories (2004).

Nonfiction collections 
 A Supposedly Fun Thing I'll Never Do Again (1997).  
 Consider the Lobster (2005).  
 Both Flesh and Not (2012).  [posthumous]

Other books 
 2003: Everything and More: A Compact History of Infinity.
 2010: Fate, Time, and Language: An Essay on Free Will. Columbia University Press, 2010 [reprint]. . An essay collection.
 (2014): The David Foster Wallace Reader. . [posthumous] A collection of excerpts.

Awards and honors
 Pulitzer Prize nomination for The Pale King, 2012. No prize was awarded for the fiction category that year
 Inclusion of "Good Old Neon" in The O. Henry Prize Stories 2002
 John D. and Catherine T. MacArthur Foundation Fellowship, 1997–2002
 Lannan Foundation Residency Fellow, July–August 2000
 Named to Usage Panel, The American Heritage Dictionary of the English Language 4th Ed. et seq., 1999
 Inclusion of "The Depressed Person" in Prize Stories 1999: The O. Henry Awards
 Illinois State University, Outstanding University Researcher, 1998 and 1999
 Aga Khan Prize for Fiction for the story "Brief Interviews with Hideous Men #6", 1997
 Time magazine's Best Books of the Year (Fiction), 1996
 Salon Book Award (Fiction), 1996
 Lannan Literary Award (Fiction), 1996
 Inclusion of "Here and There" in Prize Stories 1989: The O. Henry Awards
 Whiting Award, 1987

See also 
 Hysterical realism
 Postmodern literature
 Inverse cost and quality law

References

Sources

External links

Biographical
 David Foster Wallace Archive, The University of Texas at Austin
 Whiting Foundation Profile

Portals
 David Foster Wallace AUDIO PROJECT
 International David Foster Wallace Society

1962 births
2008 suicides
20th-century American essayists
20th-century American male writers
20th-century American novelists
20th-century American short story writers
21st-century American essayists
21st-century American male writers
21st-century American novelists
21st-century American short story writers
American male essayists
American male novelists
American male short story writers
American people of Scottish descent
Amherst College alumni
Amherst Mammoths men's tennis players
Emerson College faculty
Harvard Graduate School of Arts and Sciences alumni
Illinois State University faculty
MacArthur Fellows
McLean Hospital patients
Novelists from Illinois
Novelists from Massachusetts
Novelists from New York (state)
People from Champaign, Illinois
People with mood disorders
Pomona College faculty
Postmodern writers
Sportswriters from Illinois
Sportswriters from New York (state)
Suicides by hanging in California
University of Arizona alumni
Writers from Ithaca, New York
Writers from Urbana, Illinois
Yaddo alumni